Juiaparus is a genus of beetles in the family Cerambycidae, containing the following species:

 Juiaparus batus (Linnaeus, 1758)
 Juiaparus erythropus (Nonfried, 1895)
 Juiaparus lasiocerus (Gahan, 1892)
 Juiaparus mexicanus (Thomson, 1860)
 Juiaparus punctulatus (Gahan, 1892)

References

Cerambycini